FC Písek is a football club located in Písek, Czech Republic. It currently plays in the Bohemian Football League, which is the third tier of the Czech football system.

History
The club was founded in 1910 as SK Písek. In 2008 the club was promoted to the Bohemian Football League (3rd league) and with an exception of 2013–14 season it is a regular participant of this league.

References

External links
  

Football clubs in the Czech Republic
Sport in Písek
1910 establishments in Austria-Hungary
Association football clubs established in 1910